Ichneutica cana is a moth of the family Noctuidae. It is endemic to New Zealand.

Taxonomy 
I. cana was first described by George Howes in 1914 from a single male specimen collected  in the Garvie Mountains, near Lake Wakatipu in Otago. This species was illustrated and discussed in George Hudson's 1928 book The Butterflies and Moths of New Zealand. John S. Dugdale agreed with the placement of this species within the genus Ichneutica in 1988. Robert J. B. Hoare also confirmed the placement of this species within the genus Ichneutica in his major review of New Zealand Noctuidae species in 2019.

Description 
Howes originally described the species as follows:
I. cana is similar in appearance to I. eris but there are visual differences between the two species.

Geographic range 
This species is found only in the South Island, in the eastern and southern parts of that Island as well as in Fiordland. Unlike I. eris, I. cana does not appear to be present in the north-west of the South Island.

Habitat 
I. cana can be found in alpine habitat.

Life history and host species 
The life history of this species is unknown as are the host species of its larvae.

Behaviour 
The adults of this species are on the wing during December and January. The males of this species are on the wing during sunny days, and both sexes are attracted to light.

References

Hadeninae
Moths of New Zealand
Moths described in 1914
Endemic fauna of New Zealand
Endemic moths of New Zealand